This article lists political parties in Northern Cyprus.  The Turkish Republic of Northern Cyprus has a multi-party system.

Active parties

Parties represented in the Assembly

Parties without representation
Communal Democracy Party (Toplumcu Demokrasi Partisi)
Communal Liberation Party New Forces (Toplumcu Kurtuluş Partisi Yeni Güçler)
Nationalist Democracy Party (Milliyetçi Demokrasi Partisi)
New Cyprus Party (Yeni Kıbrıs Partisi)
United Cyprus Party (Birleşik Kıbrıs Partisi)
Cyprus Socialist Party (Kıbrıs Sosyalist Partisi)
Independence Path (Bağımsızlık Yolu Partisi)
Freedom and Peace Party (Özgürlük ve Barış Partisi)

See also
List of political parties in Cyprus
List of political parties

Political parties in Northern Cyprus
Northern Cyprus
 

Political parties
Parties